Los Guerrero is a town in the municipality of San Martín de Hidalgo in the state of Jalisco, Mexico. It has a population of 674 inhabitants.

References

External links
Los Guerrero at PueblosAmerica.com

Populated places in Jalisco